Edu is a Local Government Area in Kwara State. A Nupe speaking  area in Nigeria. Edu consists of Lafiagi, Tsaragi and Tshonga Town. Its headquarters are in the town of Lafiagi.

It has an area of 2,542 km and a population of 201,469 as of the 2006 census.

The postal code of the area is 243.

References

Local Government Areas in Kwara State